Anodonta pseudodopsis is a species of medium-sized freshwater mussel, an aquatic bivalve mollusc in the family Unionidae, the river mussels.

Distribution
This species is found only within the basin of the Orontes River, in Syria, Turkey, and possibly Lebanon. It was last seen in Gölbaşı Lake. Its survival is threatened by water extraction, pollution, wetland draining, and the construction of dams.

References

pseudodopsis
Endangered animals
Molluscs described in 1883